Nima Entezari (born 18 July 1996) is an Iranian footballer who plays as a midfielder who currently plays for Iranian club Havadar in the Persian Gulf Pro League.

Club career

Pars Jonoubi Jam
He made his debut for Pars Jonoubi Jam in 7h fixtures of 2018–19 Iran Pro League against Machine Sazi.

References

1996 births
Living people
Iranian footballers
People from Babol
Pars Jonoubi Jam players
Association football midfielders
Havadar S.C. players
Sportspeople from Mazandaran province
21st-century Iranian people